Ludvig Grundtvig (12 May 1836 – 28 November 1901) was a Danish photographer and portrait painter. He based many of his later paintings on his own photographs.

Early life

Born in Nykøbing Falster, Grundtvig studied at the Danish Academy from 1851 to 1857, winning two awards.

Professional career

For a number of years, Grundvig exhibited his portrait paintings at Charlottenborg in Copenhagen. In 1863, he set up a studio as a photographer on Amagertorv in the centre of the city which he maintained until his death in 1901. But he also continued to produce paintings and drawings in his studio, many based on his own photographs. Although he specialized in portraits, he also took landscapes such as the large photograph of the cliffs of Bornholm from 1870 which can be seen in the Royal Library of Denmark.

Titles and exhibitions

In 1867, Grundtvig became a member of the Dansk Fotografisk Forening (Danish Photographers Association). In 1871, he was the judge for photography at the Nordic Industry and Art Exhibition.

He exhibited at Charlottenborg in 1857, 1859, 1861–1864 and 1893.

Sources
This article draws heavily on Ludvig Grundtvig's biography at Kunstindeks Denmark.

See also
Photography in Denmark

References

1836 births
1901 deaths
19th-century Danish photographers
Danish artists
Royal Danish Academy of Fine Arts alumni
People from Guldborgsund Municipality